Anna Brzezińska (born 9 January 1971 in Brzeg, Opole Voivodeship) is a retired Polish middle-distance runner who specialized in the 1500 metres. She adopted the New Zealand nationality on 1999-01-22.

Achievements

References
 
 

1971 births
Living people
New Zealand female middle-distance runners
Polish female middle-distance runners
Athletes (track and field) at the 1992 Summer Olympics
Athletes (track and field) at the 1996 Summer Olympics
Olympic athletes of Poland
People from Brzeg
Sportspeople from Opole Voivodeship